Fonteno is a comune (municipality) in the Province of Bergamo in the Italian region of Lombardy, located about  northeast of Milan and about  northeast of Bergamo.

The municipality of Fonteno contains the frazione (subdivision) Xino.

Fonteno borders the following municipalities: Adrara San Rocco, Endine Gaiano, Monasterolo del Castello, Parzanica, Riva di Solto, Solto Collina, Vigolo.

Demographic evolution

References